Filippo Crino or Filippo Zurio (died 1633) was a Roman Catholic prelate who served as Bishop of Belcastro (1629–1633).

Biography
On 19 November 1629, Filippo Crino was appointed during the papacy of Pope Urban VIII as Bishop of Belcastro. 
On 16 December 1629, he was consecrated bishop by Laudivio Zacchia, Bishop of Corneto e Montefiascone, with Francesco Venturi, Bishop Emeritus of San Severo, and Pasquale Grassi, Bishop of Chioggia, serving as co-consecrators. 
He served as Bishop of Belcastro until his death in 1633.

References

External links and additional sources
 (for Chronology of Bishops) 
 (for Chronology of Bishops) 

17th-century Italian Roman Catholic bishops
Bishops appointed by Pope Urban VIII
1633 deaths